Henry Buguet (18 November 1845 in Paris - 10 June 1920) was a French journalist and dramatist.

19th-century French dramatists and playwrights
19th-century French journalists
French male journalists
French opera librettists
Writers from Paris
1845 births
1920 deaths
19th-century French male writers